The Gustavus and Sarah T. Pike House is a historic house at 164 Fairfield Avenue, in the southwestern section of the city of Stamford, Connecticut is a Queen Anne style house built in 1880.  It was listed on the National Register of Historic Places in 1990.  It is architecturally significant as a good example of a Queen Anne style house in Stamford, and also an excellent example of pattern book application.  The building follows a pattern book design by H. H. Holly.  It includes machine-made spindle and other detailing that only then became cost-effective with then-modern manufacturing.

See also
National Register of Historic Places listings in Stamford, Connecticut

References

Houses on the National Register of Historic Places in Connecticut
Queen Anne architecture in Connecticut
Houses completed in 1880
Houses in Stamford, Connecticut
National Register of Historic Places in Fairfield County, Connecticut